Kanfory Sylla (born 7 July 1980 in Conakry) is a Guinean football defensive all-arounder who currently plays for Zakho FC in the Iraqi Premier League. He played for Sivasspor, İstanbul BB and Konyaspor in Turkey's Super League.

International football

Sylla was part of the Guinea National Teams that competed at the Africa Cup of Nations in 2004, 2006 and 2008.

External links

TFF
Guardian Stats Centre

1980 births
Living people
Guinean footballers
Guinea international footballers
2004 African Cup of Nations players
2006 Africa Cup of Nations players
2008 Africa Cup of Nations players
R. Charleroi S.C. players
Kallithea F.C. players
Ethnikos Asteras F.C. players
Sivasspor footballers
EGS Gafsa players
Expatriate footballers in Turkey
Sportspeople from Conakry
Süper Lig players
Guinean expatriate sportspeople in Turkey
Konyaspor footballers
Expatriate footballers in Belgium
Expatriate footballers in Greece
Expatriate footballers in Tunisia
Guinean expatriate sportspeople in Tunisia
Expatriate footballers in Iraq
Belgian Pro League players
Guinean expatriate footballers
Association football defenders
Association football midfielders